Yellow Lake may refer to:

Yellow Lake (Michigan), a lake
Yellow Lake (New York), a lake
Yellow Lake, Wisconsin, an unincorporated community
Yellow Lake (Wisconsin), a lake
Taal Volcano Main Crater Lake, historically known as Yellow Lake